Mesa is a city in Maricopa County, in the U.S. state of Arizona. It is the most populous city in the East Valley section of the Phoenix Metropolitan Area. It is bordered by Tempe on the west, the Salt River Pima-Maricopa Indian Community on the north, Chandler and Gilbert on the south along with Queen Creek, and Apache Junction on the east.

Mesa is the third-largest city in Arizona after Phoenix and Tucson, the 37th-largest city in the US, and the largest city that is not a county seat. The city is home to 504,258 people as of 2020 according to the Census Bureau and has been described as "America's most conservative city".

More than 40,000 students are enrolled in more than 10 colleges and universities located in Mesa, including the Polytechnic campus of Arizona State University, Benedictine University, A.T. Still University, Upper Iowa University, Mesa Community College and Chandler-Gilbert Community College. Private for-profit institutions include Arizona College, Carrington College, DeVry University, Pima Medical Institute, and CAE Phoenix Aviation Academy. In January 2020, Arizona State University broke ground on ASU at Mesa City Center, a project offering programs from the Herberger Institute for Design and Arts that will be located in downtown Mesa that is scheduled to open in spring 2022. It is also home to the largest relief airport in the Phoenix area, Phoenix-Mesa Gateway Airport, which is in the southeastern corner of the city.

History

The history of Mesa dates back at least 2,000 years to the arrival of the Hohokam people. The Hohokam, whose name means "All Used Up" or "The Departed Ones", built the original canal system. The canals were the largest and most sophisticated in the prehistoric New World. By A.D. 1450, the Hohokam had constructed hundreds of miles of canals many of which are still in use today.

After the disappearance of the Hohokam and before the arrival of the early settlers little is known, as explorers did not venture into this area. By the late 19th century near present-day Mesa, U.S. Army troops relocated the Apache, opening the way for settlement.

Mormon pioneer Daniel Webster Jones, with Henry Clay Rogers as his right-hand man, left St. George, Utah in March 1877. Jones had been asked by Mormon officials to direct a party of people in establishing a settlement in Arizona. They traveled south and settled on the north side of the present Mesa area. This settlement was initially known as Fort Utah and later as Jonesville. It was located about where Lehi Road is now. In 1883 it was named Lehi at the suggestion of Brigham Young, Jr.

About this same time, another group dubbed the First Mesa Company arrived from Utah and Idaho. Their leaders were named Francis Martin Pomeroy, Charles Crismon, George Warren Sirrine and Charles I. Robson. Rather than accepting an invitation to settle at Jones' Lehi settlement, they moved up onto the mesa that serves as the city's namesake. They dug irrigation canals and used some of the original Hohokam canals. By April 1878, water was flowing through them. The Second Mesa Company arrived in 1879 and settled to the west of the First Mesa Company because of more available farmland. This settlement was originally called Alma and later Stringtown. It was located about where Alma School Road is now.

On July 17, 1878, Mesa City was registered as a  townsite. The first school was built in 1879. In 1883, Mesa City was incorporated with a population of 300 people. Dr. A. J. Chandler, who would later go on to found the city of Chandler, worked on widening the Mesa Canal in 1895 to allow for enough flow to build a power plant. In 1917, the city of Mesa purchased this utility company. The revenues from the company provided enough for capital expenditures until the 1960s. During the Great Depression, WPA funds provided paved streets, a new hospital, a new town hall and a library.

After the founding of the city the elected official that most impacted the municipality was George Nicholas Goodman. He was mayor 5 different times in parts of 3 different decade (1938–1942, 1946–1948, 1952–1956) (see: List of mayors of Mesa, Arizona). As mayor he was directly involved in the process of acquiring land for both Falcon Field and Williams Field.

With the opening of Falcon Field and Williams Field in the early 1940s, more military personnel began to move into the Mesa area. With the advent of air conditioning and the rise of tourism, population growth exploded in Mesa as well as the rest of the Phoenix area. Industry—especially early aerospace companies—grew in the 1950s and 1960s. As late as 1960, half of the residents of Mesa made a living with agriculture, but this has declined substantially as Mesa's suburban growth continued on track with the rest of the Phoenix metro area.

Geography

Defining east and west Mesa

Mesa employs a grid system for street numbering that is different from that used in Phoenix and other portions of the metropolitan area. Center Street, running north to south, bisects Mesa into eastern and western halves and serves as the east and west numbering point of origin within Mesa. Streets west of Center St., such as W. University Drive or W. Main St. are considered to be in West Mesa, whereas streets east of Center St., such as E. University or E. Main St., are considered to be in East Mesa.

Climate
Located in the Sonoran Desert, Mesa has a hot desert climate (Köppen: BWh), with mild winters and very hot summers.

Demographics

According to the 2020 Census, the racial composition of Mesa was:
 White: 65.7% (Non-Hispanic Whites: 59.6%)
 Hispanic or Latino (of any race): 27.3%
 Black or African American: 4.2%
 Two or more races: 12.3%
 Native American: 2.7%
 Asian: 2.6%
 Native Hawaiian and Other Pacific Islander: 0.4%

According to the 2010 Census, the racial composition of Mesa was:
 White: 83.8% (Non-Hispanic Whites: 62.6%)
 Hispanic or Latino (of any race): 27.4%
 Black or African American: 3.7%
 Two or more races: 3.1%
 Native American: 2.3%
 Asian: 2.0%
 Native Hawaiian and Other Pacific Islander: 0.4%

As of the census of 2010, there were 439,041 people, 146,643 households, and 99,863 families residing in the city.

The racial make-up of the city was 81.6% White, 2.4% Black or African American, 2.2% Native American, 2.0% Asian, 0.1% Pacific Islander, 9.3% from other races, and 1.3% from two or more races. 24.0% of the population were Hispanic or Latino of any race.

There were 146,643 households, out of which 33.4% had children under the age of 18 living with them, 52.7% were married couples living together, 10.6% had a female householder with no husband present, and 31.9% were non-families. 24.2% of all households were made up of individuals, and 9.1% had someone living alone who was 65 years of age or older. The average household size was 2.68 and the average family size was 3.20.

The age distribution was 27.3% under 18, 11.2% from 18 to 24, 29.7% from 25 to 44, 18.4% from 45 to 64, and 13.3% who were 65 or older. The median age was 32 years. For every 100 females, there were 98.2 males. For every 100 females age 18 and over, there were 95.6 males.

The median income for a household in the city was $42,817, and the median income for a family was $49,232. Males had a median income of $35,960 versus $27,005 for females. The per capita income for the city was $19,601. About 6.2% of families and 8.9% of the population were below the poverty line, including 10.7% of those under age 18 and 7.1% of those age 65 or over.

Economy

Top employers
According to the city's 2020 Comprehensive Annual Financial Report, the top employers in the city are:

Cultural attractions

 HoHoKam Park of the Cactus League, home of the Oakland Athletics and former home of the Chicago Cubs during spring training, the WAC baseball tournament and former summer home to the now defunct Mesa Miners professional baseball team of the Golden Baseball League
 Sloan Park, opened in 2014 as the new Cactus League spring training home of the Chicago Cubs
 Mesa Arts Center
 Mesa Amphitheater
 Museums
 I.d.e.a. Museum
 Commemorative Air Force Arizona Wing Aircraft Museum, located at Falcon Field – B-17 Sentimental Journey
 Mesa Contemporary Arts Museum, Mesa Arts Center
 Mesa Historical Museum
 Arizona Museum of Natural History
 Archeological sites
 Mesa Grande Ruins
 Park of the Canals
 Public libraries
 Main Library (MN)
 Dobson Ranch Branch (DR)
 Mesa Express Library (MEL)
 Red Mountain Branch (RM)
 Water parks
 Golfland Sunsplash waterpark on U.S. 60
 The only highrise in Mesa is the Bank of America (formerly Western Savings) building near Fiesta Mall.
 Organ Stop Pizza, containing the world's largest Wurlitzer organ
 Bell Bank Park a 320-acre sports and recreation complex

Historic properties in Mesa

Numerous properties in the city are considered to be historical and have been included either in the National Register of Historic Places or the listings of the Mesa Historic Properties.

Parks and recreation
Mesa has over 2,280 acres of parkland in the city limits. Its largest is Red Mountain Park which spans 1,146 acres. It includes a lake, playgrounds, a basketball court and a cement volleyball court.

Golf
Mesa is home to numerous championship golf courses, including the original course in town, Mesa Country Club. This course was founded in the late 1940s by the original leaders of the town, and "Country Club Drive", the most prominent street in Mesa, was at one point the modest entrance to the club.

West Mesa

The abandoned Fiesta Mall is located in West Mesa, and owned by Westcor. Its anchors were Sears and Best Buy. It is located near several shopping centers, Mesa's Bank of America, and other retail stores, banks, and restaurants. Though deserted, a refurbishment and expansion of the mall has been planned.

Mesa Riverview is a new outdoor destination retail center in the northwestern corner of the city, near Loop 202 and Dobson Road. At build-out the center will include  of retail space. Its anchors include Bass Pro Shops, Cinemark Theaters, Wal-Mart, and Home Depot.

East Mesa
Located in East Mesa is Superstition Springs Business Park. It includes the Superstition Springs Center, a shopping mall owned by Macerich. It features an outdoor amphitheatre and fountain which convert to a stage. Anchor stores at the mall are Dillard's, JCPenney, and Macy's. Mission Community Church, previously known as Superstition Springs Community Church, was initially named after this business park.

Education
Almost all of the city of Mesa is served by public schools operated by Mesa Public Schools; however, a small southern portion is served by the Gilbert Public Schools and the Queen Creek Unified School District, and a small western portion is served by the Tempe Elementary School District and the Tempe Union High School District.

Pilgrim Lutheran School is a Christian Pre-K-8 school of the Wisconsin Evangelical Lutheran Synod in Mesa.

Mesa is home to Mesa Community College, the largest of the Maricopa Community Colleges, which enrolls over 24,000 full and part-time students. The Polytechnic campus of Arizona State University lies in southeast Mesa. This satellite campus enrolls over 6,000 undergraduate and graduate students in scientific and engineering fields. A. T. Still University operates an Osteopathic Medical School in Mesa. The aviation school CAE Global Academy Phoenix is located in Mesa.

After launching a higher education initiative in 2012, Mesa became home to branch campuses of five private, liberal arts institutions: Albright College, Westminster College, Benedictine University, Upper Iowa University and Wilkes University. Two have since left (Albright College and Westminster College), while a third, Wilkes University, recently announced it would move entirely online.

Transportation

Several area freeways serve the Mesa area, such as U.S. Route 60, locally known as the Superstition Freeway, which runs between Apache Junction and Phoenix. It is also served by SR 87 and bypass loops Loop 101, which skirts the western city limits as the Price Freeway, and Loop 202, which bypasses the city on the north and east. The main east–west arterial road in Mesa is Main Street (former US 60/70/80/89), serving Downtown Mesa.  The primary north–south arterials include Country Club Drive, Gilbert Road, and Power Road.

Public transportation in Mesa is provided by Valley Metro via bus and light rail (Valley Metro Rail). The light rail section in Mesa spans about four miles from Sycamore/Main St in the west of the city, through downtown to Mesa Dr/Main St. Until July 2008, Mesa was the largest U.S. city with no public transit service on Sundays, but now has Sunday service available on Routes 40-Apache/Main, 61-Southern, 96-Dobson, 108-Elliot, 112-Country Club/Arizona, 156-Chandler/Williams Field, and 184-Power. Up to the final years of Southern Pacific passenger railroad service, the Sunset Limited passenger train used to make stops in Mesa.

Air service in the city is provided by two airports. Falcon Field, located in the northeastern part of the area, was established as a training field for British RAF pilots during World War II and was transferred to the city at the end of the war. Falcon Field has 605 aircraft based there. Boeing builds the AH-64 Apache attack helicopter at a facility adjoining Falcon Field. Phoenix-Mesa Gateway Airport is located in the far southeastern area of the city, and provides alternate but limited air service when compared to Sky Harbor International Airport. Phoenix-Mesa Gateway was formerly Williams Gateway Airport, and before that, Williams Air Force Base, which closed in 1993. Williams Gateway was announced as a new Focus City for Allegiant Air. Service started October 25, 2007.

Healthcare
The public hospital system, Valleywise Health (formerly Maricopa Integrated Health System), operates Valleywise Community Health Center – Mesa and Valleywise Behavioral Health Center – Mesa. Its sole hospital, Valleywise Health Medical Center, is in Phoenix.

Notable people

 Jim Adkins, musician in the band from Mesa, Jimmy Eat World
 Travis Alexander, murder victim
 Beau Allred, professional baseball pitcher
 Janice Merrill Allred, author
 Helen Andelin, author
 Tyson Apostol, reality television star
 Authority Zero, punk rock band
 John Beck, professional football player
 Art Bisch, race car driver
 Mike Brown, professional basketball coach
 Marcus Brunson, professional sprinter
 Bruce Crandall, Medal of Honor pilot, 1st Cavalry Veteran of Ia Drang November 14, 1965
 Jonathan Dean, ambassador, representative to the Mutual and Balanced Force Reductions 
 Julie Ertz, world champion soccer player
 Austin Gibbs, musician
 George Nicholas Goodman, pharmacist and former mayor of Mesa
 Max Hall, professional football player
 Mickey Hatcher, professional baseball player
 Carl Hayden, Arizona senator, and its first representative in the House; died in Mesa in 1972
 Todd Heap, professional football player
 Kalani Hilliker, dancer, actress, model, fashion designer, and YouTuber
 Jamar Hunt, professional football player
 Autumn Hurlbert, actress
 Misty Hyman, Olympic gold medalist in swimming
 Troy Kotsur, Academy Award-winning deaf actor
 Rudy Lavik, college basketball coach
 Mike Lee, U.S. senator
 Albie Lopez, professional baseball player
 Brad Mills, professional baseball pitcher
 Ernesto Miranda, conviction overturned by the Supreme Court of the United States in Miranda v. Arizona creating the Miranda warning, buried in the City of Mesa Cemetery
 Carolyn Morris, professional baseball player (A.A.G.P.B.L.)
 Buck Owens, singer, member of the Country Music Hall of Fame
 Rudy Owens, professional baseball player
 John Jacob Rhodes, politician, House Minority Leader of the U.S. House of Representatives
 John Jacob Rhodes III, politician, former member of the U.S. House of Representatives
 Larry Schweikart, author
 Jake Shears, lead male singer for the pop band Scissor Sisters
 Vai Sikahema, professional football player, General Authority the Church of Jesus Christ of Latter-day Saints
 Lynn Toler, judge for Divorce Court
 Kelly Townsend, Arizona state representative, Legislative District 16 (including parts of East Mesa)
 Don Taylor Udall, state legislator and judge
 Tara VanFlower, singer, songwriter of Lycia
 Brooke White, singer-songwriter and fifth place finalist on the seventh season of American Idol
 Danny White, professional football player, Arizona Athlete of the Century (20th)
 Wilford "Whizzer" White, professional football player
 Vance Wilson, former New York Mets catcher and current coach for the Kansas City Royals
 Roger L. Worsley, educator, formerly with Mesa High School and Mesa Community College

Sister cities

  Burnaby, British Columbia, Canada
  Caraz, Peru
  Guaymas, Mexico
  Kaiping, Guangdong, China
  Upper Hutt, New Zealand

See also

 Arizona Commemorative Air Force Museum
 The Church of Jesus Christ of Latter-day Saints in Arizona
 City of Mesa Cemetery
 Life Teen
 Mesa Distance Learning Program
 Shooting of Daniel Shaver
 Tri-City Pavilions

References
Notes

Bibliograph

External links

 Official government website
 Mesa Arizona Convention and Visitors Bureau – Tourism
 Mesa news, sports and things to do from The Mesa Republic newspaper
 Mesa Public Library
 Mesa Chamber of Commerce

 
Cities in Arizona
Phoenix metropolitan area
Populated places established in 1878
Cities in Maricopa County, Arizona
Populated places in the Sonoran Desert
1878 establishments in Arizona Territory